Massimo Maria Allevi (born 23 November 1969, in Ascoli Piceno) is a former Italian pole vaulter.

Biography
Massimo Allevi has won 3 times the individual national championship. He was the gold medallist at the 2001 World Military Track and Field Championships in Beirut.

National titles
1 win in the pole vault (1993) at the Italian Athletics Championships
2 wins in the pole vault (1992, 2000) at the Italian Athletics Indoor Championships

See also
 Italian all-time lists - Pole vault

References

External links
 

Living people
1969 births
Italian male pole vaulters
Athletics competitors of Fiamme Azzurre